John William Peters (July 14, 1893 – February 21, 1932) was a reserve catcher in Major League Baseball who played in parts of four seasons for the Detroit Tigers (1915), Cleveland Indians (1918) and Philadelphia Phillies (1921–1922). Peters batted and threw right-handed.

Biography
He was born in Kansas City, Kansas.

In 112 games, Peters was a .265 hitter (80-for-132) with seven home runs, 22 runs, and 47 RBI.

Peters died in Kansas City at the age of 38.

Sources
Baseball Reference
Retrosheet

1893 births
1932 deaths
Cleveland Indians players
Detroit Tigers players
Philadelphia Phillies players
Major League Baseball catchers
Baseball players from Kansas
Sportspeople from Kansas City, Kansas
Davenport Blue Sox players
Grand Forks Flickertails players
Chattanooga Lookouts players
Kansas City Blues (baseball) players
Birmingham Barons players
Salt Lake City Bees players
Hollywood Stars players